Tyrell Allen Burgess (born 5 March 1986) is a Bermudian footballer, currently playing for North Village Rams.

Career

College and amateur
Born in Smith's Parish, Burgess began his career at North Village CC, before moving from his native Bermuda to Wilbraham, Massachusetts when he was 16 to attend the Wilbraham & Monson Academy. He played college soccer at NCAA Division III Rhode Island College in 2006, helping the Anchormen to an Eastern College Athletic Conference New England title with four goals and five assists in 18 matches. He transferred to Lynn University in 2007, where he was named to the NCAA Division II All-Sunshine State Conference (SSC) First Team as a senior. In total, Burgess tallied 14 goals and added 14 assists in 53 games for Lynn.

During his college years Burgess also played for Reading Rage in the USL Premier Development League, helping the team capture the 2008 Mid Atlantic Division regular season title, as well as the Eastern Conference playoff title.

Professional
Burgess joined the Vancouver Whitecaps FC of the USL First Division on January 30, 2009, after impressing during an open player combine held in Palmyra, Pennsylvania in December 2008. Burgess played in 23 games and scored one goal in his debut season, before being released by the Whitecaps on November 27, 2009.

Burgess returned to his home country in 2010 when he signed to play with the Bermuda Hogges in the USL Premier Development League.

In June 2010, Burgess was invited to spend a trial period with English Conference National side Gateshead. Burgess wasn't offered a contract by Gateshead, despite scoring the winner in a pre-season friendly against Harrogate Town.

International
Burgess is a full member of Bermuda national football team and has represented his country in 12 FIFA World Cup qualification matches. He scored his first goal for the senior side in a 1-1 draw with the Cayman Islands during 2010 FIFA World Cup qualifying game on March 30, 2008. Burgess has also played for Bermuda’s U-17 and U-20 national teams.

International goals

|-
| 1. || 3 February 2008 || Bermuda National Stadium, Devonshire Parish, Bermuda ||  ||  ||  || 2010 FIFA World Cup qualification||
|-
| 2. || rowspan="4"| 11 September 2012 || rowspan="4"| Stade Sylvio Cator, Port-au-Prince, Haiti || rowspan="4"|  ||  || rowspan="4"|  || rowspan="4"| 2012 Caribbean Cup qualification || rowspan="4"| 
|-
| 3. || 
|-
| 4. || 
|-
| 5. || 
|-
| 6. || 15 July 2013 || Bermuda National Stadium, Devonshire Parish, Bermuda ||  ||  ||  || 2013 Island Games||
|-
| 7. || 29 March 2015 || Bermuda National Stadium, Devonshire Parish, Bermuda ||  ||  ||  || 2018 FIFA World Cup qualification||
|}

References

External links
 Vancouver Whitecaps bio
 

1986 births
Living people
People from Smith's Parish
Association football midfielders
Bermudian footballers
Bermudian expatriate footballers
Reading United A.C. players
Vancouver Whitecaps (1986–2010) players
Bermuda Hogges F.C. players
North Village Rams players
USL League Two players
USL First Division players
Lynn Fighting Knights men's soccer players
Expatriate soccer players in the United States
Expatriate soccer players in Canada
Wilbraham & Monson Academy alumni
Bermuda international footballers
Bermuda under-20 international footballers
Bermuda youth international footballers